Senator Newman may refer to:

Alexander Newman (1804–1849), Virginia State Senate
Alfred Newman (jurist) (1834–1898), Wisconsin State Senate
James W. Newman (1841–1901), Ohio State Senate
Josh Newman (politician) (born 1964), California State Senate
Scott Newman (politician) (born 1947), Minnesota State Senate
Stephen Newman (born 1964), Virginia State Senate

See also
Senator Neumann (disambiguation)